Placospongia is a genus of sea sponges belonging to the family Placospongiidae.

This genus is characterized by a high density of siliceous spicules. Members of this genus are known to be eaten by hawksbill turtles.

Species
Placospongia carinata
Placospongia melobesioides

References

Hadromerida